Lizzie Juvkam (10 October 1883 – 4 September 1969) was a Norwegian novelist.
She made her literary debut in 1942, with the novel Virgins vei. Among her novels are Antonia og yogien from 1948 and Eneboere from 1952.

She was awarded Mads Wiel Nygaards Endowment in 1953, jointly with Magnhild Haalke.

References

1883 births
1969 deaths
People from Drammen
Norwegian women novelists
20th-century Norwegian novelists
20th-century Norwegian women writers